is a town located in Chiba Prefecture, Japan. , the town had an estimated population of  23,467 in 9771 households and a population density of 350 persons per km².

Geography
Yokoshibahikari is located in northeastern Bōsō Peninsula, bordered by the Pacific Ocean to the east. It is about 35 kilometers from the prefectural capital at Chiba, and about 60 to 70 kilometers from the center of Tokyo. The town lacks a center, but instead consists of a collection of hamlets scattered over the countryside extending from the Yokoshiba Station on the Sōbu Main Line. Given such sparse structure, it takes quite a long time for the bus lines to serve the whole town. The coastal area of Yokoshibahikari, which makes up part of Kujūkuri Beach, is protected as part of Kujūkuri Prefectural Natural Park.

Surrounding municipalities
Chiba Prefecture
Sanmu
Shibayama
Sōsa
Tako

Climate
Yokoshibahikari has a humid subtropical climate (Köppen Cfa) characterized by warm summers and cool winters with light to no snowfall.

Demographics
Per Japanese census data, the population of Yokoshibahikari has remained relatively steady over the past 70 years.

History
Yokoshibahikari spans the border between the former provinces of Kazusa and Shimōsa. The village of Asahi was established in Sanbu District with the establishment of the modern municipalities system on April 1, 1889. It changed its name to Yokoshiba on December 28, 1892 and was raised to town status on February 1, 1955. The town of Hikari in Sōsa District was created by the merger of four villages on May 3, 1954. Yokoshibahikari was formed by the merger on March 27, 2006 of the towns of Hikari and Yokoshiba. Sōsa District was dissolved as a result of this merger.

Government
Yokoshibahikari has a mayor-council form of government with a directly elected mayor and a unicameral town council of 16 members. Yokoshibahikari, together with neighboring Sanmu and the municipalities of Sanmu District collectively contributes two members to the Chiba Prefectural Assembly. In terms of national politics, the town is part of Chiba 10th district of the lower house of the Diet of Japan.

Economy
Agriculture has been a mainstay of the economy of Yokoshibahikari since early times. The town has a cool winter and mild summer. Other than extensive rice cultivation, the town is a center of production of negi, the Welsh onion, tomatoes, and kabocha, a Japanese variety of winter squash. Pig and dairy farms are also found in the town. The town traditionally produced ceramics. In 1991 the northern part of the town was designated as the Yokoshiba Industrial Park due to its close proximity to Narita International Airport.

Education
Yokoshibahikari has seven public elementary schools and two public middle schools operated by the town government, and one public high school operated by the Chiba Prefectural Board of Education.

Transportation

Railway
 JR East –  Sōbu Main Line

Highway

Noted people from Sodegaura
Konishiki Yasokichi I, Sumo wrestler

Local attractions
Shibayama Kofun cluster, a National Historic Site
Kujūkuri Beach

Gallery

References

External links

Official Website 

Towns in Chiba Prefecture
Populated coastal places in Japan
Yokoshibahikari